The Oshaktas Steles is a historical monument, which is located in the State National Natural Park "Altyn-Emel" in Almaty region Republic of Kazakhstan.

Description 
The Oshaktas stone steles located near the mountains of Kalkan in open foothill plains. The historical monument of Oshaktas is 3 blocks of stone about 2 meters high, which are installed vertically. 
There are 2 versions of the monument formation. 
According to the first legend, in 1219, the Mongol conqueror Genghis Khan, during his campaign to conquer Central Asia, set up a camp near the Mynbulak cordon. A giant cauldron was set up on the rocks where food was prepared. 
According to the second version, "Oshaktas" designed as a signal tower, where a fire lit in case of approaching enemies.

References

External links 

 Altyn Emel park

Monuments and memorials in Kazakhstan